The Port of Sulina is a Romanian port situated on the Black Sea, close to the northern border with Ukraine. Located in Sulina, it is the last city through which the Danube flows before entering the Black Sea.

The Port of Sulina is mainly used by the Sulina Shipyard.

References

Ports and harbours of Romania